Melliodendron is a monotypic genus of flowering plants belonging to the family Styracaceae. The only species is Melliodendron xylocarpum.

Its native range is Southern China.

References

Styracaceae
Monotypic Ericales genera
Taxa named by Heinrich von Handel-Mazzetti